Gipuzkoa is a province of Spain and a historical territory of the autonomous community of the Basque Country. Its capital city is Donostia-San Sebastián. Gipuzkoa shares borders with the French department of Pyrénées-Atlantiques at the northeast, with the province and autonomous community of Navarre at east, Biscay at west, Álava at southwest and the Bay of Biscay to its north. It is located at the easternmost extreme of the Cantabric Sea, in the Bay of Biscay. It has  of coast land.

The province has 89 municipalities and a population of 720,592 inhabitants (2018), from which more than half live in the Donostia-San Sebastián metropolitan area. Apart from the capital, other important cities are Irun, Errenteria, Zarautz, Mondragón, Eibar, Hondarribia, Oñati, Tolosa, Beasain and Pasaia.

The oceanic climate gives the province an intense green colour with little thermic oscillation. Gipuzkoa is the province of the Basque Country in which the Basque language is the most extensively used since 49.1% of its population spoke Basque in 2006.

Etymology 
The first recorded name of the province was Ipuscoa in a document from the year 1025. During the following years, and in various documents, several similar names appear, such as Ipuzcoa, Ipuçcha, Ipuzka, among others.

The full etymology the word Gipuzkoa has not been fully ascertained, but links have been made with the Basque word Giputz, containing the root ip- which is related to the word ipar (north), ipurdi (back) and ipuin (tale). According to this, ipuzko (one of the several first known denominations) might refer to something "to the north" or "in the north".

Denominations

Gipuzkoa 
Gipuzkoa is the Basque spelling recommended by the Royal Academy of the Basque Language, and it is commonly used in official documents in that language. The Basque spelling is also mandatory in official texts from the various Spanish public administrations, even in documents written in Spanish. It is the spelling most frequently used by the Spanish-language media in the Basque Country.

It is also the spelling used in the Basque version of the Spanish constitution and in the Basque version of the Statute of Autonomy of the Basque Country. Gipuzkoa is also the only official spelling approved for the historical territory by the Juntas Generales of the province.

Guipúzcoa 
Guipúzcoa is the spelling in Spanish, and it has been determined by the Association of Spanish Language Academies as being the only correct use outside official Spanish documents in which the Basque spelling is mandatory. It is also the Spanish spelling used in the Spanish version of the Constitution and in the Spanish version of the Statute of Autonomy of the Basque Country.

Geography and demographics

At  Gipuzkoa is the smallest province in Spain. The province has 88 municipalities and 709,607 inhabitants (2011), a quarter of whom live in the capital, San Sebastián. Other important towns are Irun, Errenteria, Zarautz, Arrasate, Oñati with an old university, Eibar, Tolosa which was the provincial capital for a short time, Beasain, Pasaia, the main port and Hondarribia, an old fort town across from the French Atlantic coast.

Gipuzkoa is hilly and green linking mountain and sea, and heavily populated with numerous urban nuclei that dot the whole territory. The conspicuous presence of hills and rugged terrain has added to a special leaning towards hiking, nature and mountains on the part of Gipuzkoans. Some mountains have an emblematic or iconic significance in the local tradition, their summits being topped with crosses, memorials and mountaineer postboxes. In addition, pilgrimages which have gradually lost their former religious zeal and taken on a more secular slant are sometimes held to their summits. Some renowned mountains are Aiako Harria, Hernio, Txindoki, Aizkorri and Izarraitz, amongst others.

The Aralar Natural Park is a conservation area on the border of Gipuzkoa and Navarre in the Aralar Range.

The rivers of Gipuzkoa are distinctly different from other Bay of Biscay rivers. They arise in the hilly Basque inland landscape (Basque Mountains), flow in a south- north direction, forming close, narrow  valleys before joining the ocean. The rivers extend for a short length with only a small fluctuation in the volume of water thanks to the stable rainfall all year round, and they show an abrupt drop between origin and mouth as far as the length of the river is concerned. From west to east the rivers are the Deba, Urola, Oria, Urumea, Oiartzun and Bidasoa. Except for a narrow strip extending east from the hamlet Otzaurte (Zegama) and the tunnel of San Adrian, the province drains its waters to the Atlantic basin.

Population development 

The historical population is given in the following chart:

Infrastructure

The region's communication layout is in step with its geographical features, with the main lines of infrastructure along a north -south axis up to recent times along the rivers heading to the ocean. Accordingly, the inland Way of St. James, i.e. the Tunnel Route penetrated the province via Irun and turned south-west along the Oria River towards the provincial limits at the tunnel of San Adrian. This stretch was in operation up to 1765 when the Royal Road moved to the western Deba Valley. A minor St. James route crossed Gipuzkoa east to west along the coast.

Currently, the main road cutting through Gipuzkoa largely follows that layout, i.e. the N-1 E-5 from Irun to Donostia and on to Altsasu all along the Oria River for the most part (gateway to Navarre through the pass of Etxegarate). Also, the major Irun-Madrid railway runs close to the river up to its very origin on the slopes of Aizkorri  at train stop Otzaurte in Zegama. By 1973 engineering works for the Bilbao-Behobia A-8 E-70 motorway had been completed, with the new road cutting across the valleys east to west and turning into the main axis between Donostia and Bilbao, besides enabling heavy load traffic to access the west and south of Spain as a toll road. The regional railway network Euskotren Trena also follows along the coast from east to west, while it proves impractical for long distance on the grounds of its tortuous layout and as it serves small towns. The railway network reaches the border town Hendaia before it changes to SNCF. Within the Donostialdea region, the San Sebastián Metro provides service.

The stretch of the A-15 motorway serving Gipuzkoa and Pamplona opened in 1995 embroiled in controversy under protest and an attack campaign led by ecologists, Basque leftist nationalists and eventually ETA. Conflict resolved after a deal about the definitive layout was struck. In January 2010, following a scheme drawn up by the regional government of Gipuzkoa to improve provisions for the ever-increasing road traffic, the Maltzaga-Urbina AP-1 motorway stretch leading to Gasteiz was completed, providing likewise access to the industrial areas of Arrasate and Bergara, the gateway to Álava by village Landa. AP-1 and N-1 E-5 are connected by a highway east to west from Bergara and Beasain. European traffic to south of Spain avoids Donostia's metropolitan area by means of the southern outer road ring.

The AVE high-speed rail is currently under construction, with an Y-type layout and links to the SNCF network in Hendaia (NE), Vitoria (SE), Bilbao (W) and Pamplona (S) to be completeted by 2022. Contractors were appointed, works are in place although past schedule, while strong opposition (ecologists, Basque leftist nationalists,...) and serious financial tensions made its future uncertain.

The only airport in Gipuzkoa serving just domestic flights is the San Sebastian Airport located in Hondarribia, while the air transportation needs are usually served by the nearby Bilbao and Biarritz airports.

Cultural traits
Gipuzkera, a dialect of the Basque language spoken in most of the region, shows a considerable vitality and holds a prominent position among other dialects. The Basque cultural element is apparent, including traditional dances and singing, bertsolaritza, trikiti and txistu music, baserris dotting the rural landscape, town festivals, and its signature heavy sculptures (stone, steel, iron) from the industrial tradition, all blending with the latest Basque, Spanish and international pop culture events and design trends centred in major urban areas (Donostia, Tolosa, etc.).

Traditionally a Catholic province, its patron saints are the Society of Jesus' Ignatius of Loyola, a native of this province born in the neighborhood of Loyola (Azpeitia), and Our Lady of Arantzazu.

The region has produced many famous Basque athletes for example: Jose Maria Olazabal (golfer), José Ángel Iribar, Mikel Arteta and Xabi Alonso (footballers), Abraham Olano and Domingo Perurena (cyclists), Edurne Pasaban and Alberto Iñurrategi (mountaineers), Iñaki Urdangarin (handball player), Maite Zúñiga (runner) and Paulino Uzcudun (boxer). Professional tennis player Garbiñe Muguruza's father is also a native of Gipuzkoa.

Notable natives and residents
 Abraham Olano, road racing cyclist, 1995 world road champion, 1998 world time trial champion
 Ainhoa Arteta, soprano
 Alberto Iñurrategi, mountaineer
 Andrés de Urdaneta, explorer and navigator
 Asier Illarramendi, footballer
 Bernardo Atxaga, writer
 Blas de Lezo, Admiral famed for the Battle of Cartagena de Indias
 Cosme Damián de Churruca y Elorza, Admiral of the Royal Spanish Armada
 Cristóbal Balenciaga, fashion designer
 Cristóbal de Oñate, explorer, conquistador and colonial official in New Spain
 Domingo Martínez de Irala, conquistador
 Eduardo Chillida, sculptor
 Edurne Pasaban, mountaineer
 Fernando de Villanueva (died 1679), governor of Spanish New Mexico between 1665 and 1668.
 Fernando Savater, philosopher
 Francisco de Ibarra, explorer, conquistador and the founder of the city of Durango
 Gabriel de Mendizábal Iraeta, General Officer who fought in the Peninsular War
 Ignacio Zuloaga, painter
 Iker Martínez de Lizarduy Lizarribar, Olympic sailor
 Jorge Oteiza, sculptor
 José de Urrutia, Explorer and settler of Texas in the 1600s
 José María Olazábal, golfer and winner of Masters tournament
 Jose Miguel Barandiaran, anthropologist, paleontologist
 Josune Bereziartu, rock climber
 Joxe Azurmendi, philosopher
 Juan de Tolosa, explorer, conquistador and one of the founders of Zacatecas
 Juan de Urbieta, soldier who captured king Francis I of France
 Juan Mari Arzak, chef
 Juan Sebastián Elcano, first to circumnavigate the world, 1522
 Karlos Arguiñano, chef, TV presenter and producer, and Basque pelota businessman
 Katalina Erauso, nun and soldier in the 17th century
 Koldo Mitxelena, linguist
 Lope de Aguirre, conquistador, known for his expedition of the mythical El Dorado
 Luis Arconada, footballer
 Luis Mariano, tenor
 Mariano Juaristi Atano III, Basque-pelota player
 Martín Berasategui, chef
 Martín de Murúa, friar and chronicler, made the earliest illustrated history of Peru.
 Martín Ignacio de Loyola, Franciscan friar and missionary, first person to complete the world circumnavigation twice - first time in both eastwards and westwards.
 Miguel de Oquendo y Segura, a Spanish admiral, second in command of the Spanish Armada
 Miguel López de Legazpi, navigator and Governor of Captaincy General of the Philippines
 Paco Rabanne, fashion designer
 Pío Baroja y Nessi, writer
 San Ignacio de Loyola, saint and founder of the Society of Jesus
 Sta. Cándida María de Jesús, saint and founder of the Congregation of the Hijas de Jesús
 Sto. Domingo Ibáñez de Erquicia, Dominican Saint, Martyr
 Tirso de Olazábal, Count of Arbelaiz, Politician
 Xabi Alonso, footballer

See also
List of municipalities in Gipuzkoa
History of the Basques

Notes

References

External links 

  (Information in Basque, Spanish)